Live Collection is the name of a Japanese 1987 four song live Bruce Springsteen EP. The EP features two tracks that did not make it into the Live/1975-85 collection: "For You" and "Incident on 57th Street". The River Tour performance of "Incident on 57th Street" released on this EP was the song's last outing until their 1999 reunion tour and has helped make this song a live favorite.  The original LP included a fold-out color poster, and lyric sheet with the lyrics to all four tracks in English, and Japanese. The album has since been re-released starting in 2001 on compact disc.

Track listing 
 "For You" – 5:07
 Recorded July 7, 1978 at The Roxy Theatre in Los Angeles.
 "Rosalita (Come Out Tonight)" – 9:57
 Recorded July 7, 1978 at The Roxy Theatre in Los Angeles.
 "Fire" – 2:57 
 Recorded December 16, 1978 at Winterland Ballroom in San Francisco.
 "Incident on 57th Street" – 10:07
 Recorded 1980-12-29 - Nassau Veterans Memorial Coliseum, Uniondale, NY

Personnel 
The E Street Band
 Roy Bittan – synthesizer, piano
 Clarence Clemons – saxophone, percussion
 Danny Federici – organ
 Steve Van Zandt – guitar
 Bruce Springsteen – lead vocals, guitar, harmonica
 Garry Tallent – bass guitar
 Max Weinberg – drums

References 

http://www.brucespringsteen.it/DB/detrec.aspx?code=ZOAP3326/

1987 debut EPs
Live EPs
1987 live albums
Bruce Springsteen EPs
Bruce Springsteen live albums